Ioannis Sfairopoulos (alternate spellings: Giannis, Yiannis, Yannis, Sferopoulos) (Greek: Γιάννης Σφαιρόπουλος; born March 21, 1967) is a Greek professional basketball coach.

Playing career
Sfairopoulos began playing basketball in the youth system of Apollon Kalamarias at the age of 12. After playing 2 years in the Greek 2nd Division, with the senior men's team of Apollon Kalamarias, as a player-coach, he retired from playing club basketball, at the age of 21, to become to a full-time basketball coach.

Coaching career

Clubs
After Sfairopoulos retired from playing club basketball, at the age of 21, he immediately began his basketball coaching career, within the same Apollon Kalamarias club system in which he was a player. He worked as a coach with the club, from 1986 to 1997. He coached in the club's cadets, juniors, and senior men's teams. He coached the Apollon Kalamarias senior men's team, which he took over in 1994, in both the Greek 4th Division, and the Greek 3rd Division.

He was then an assistant coach with the Greek Basket League club PAOK, from 1997 to 2005, and also was PAOK's head coach during the 2000–01 season. He then worked as an assistant head coach with Olympiacos, from 2005 to 2008, under head coaches Pini Gershon and Panagiotis Giannakis.

In 2006, he worked as an assistant coach with the NBA club Cleveland Cavaliers' NBA Summer League team. From 2008 to 2011, he was the head coach of Kolossos. In 2011, he became an assistant coach with the Russian League club CSKA Moscow, under head coach Jonas Kazlauskas. He then worked briefly as an assistant coach of the NBA's Houston Rockets.

He became the head coach of the Greek EuroCup team Panionios in 2012. He became the head coach of the Greek EuroLeague team Olympiacos in 2014. In 2015, he extended his contract with Olympiacos, through the 2017–18 season. After Olympiacos lost to Panathinaikos in the 2018 Greek League Finals, 3 games to 2, Olympiacos announced that Sfairopoulos and the club would separate ways.

On November 18, 2018, Sfairopoulos was hired as Maccabi Tel Aviv's new head coach, as he signed a 1 and-a-half year deal with the Israeli Premier League team. On June 13, 2019, Sfairopoulos led Maccabi to their 53rd Israeli League title after defeating Maccabi Rishon LeZion 89–75 in the final. He was subsequently named Israeli League Coach of the Year.

On December 15, 2019, Sfairopoulos signed a three-year contract extension with Maccabi. On February 15, 2022, Sfairopoulos was sacked from the head coach position, after a loss in the Israeli Cup semifinals, which led to public discontent, as well as a disappointing EuroLeague campaign.

Greece national team
Sfairopoulos was an assistant coach with the Greece men's national basketball team from 2001 to 2004, under head coaches Kostas Petropoulos, Giannis Ioannidis, and Panagiotis Giannakis. He was an assistant coach on the Greece national team that competed at the 2004 Summer Olympics. He also worked as assistant coach for the Greece national team from 2009 to 2010, under head coach Jonas Kazlauskas.

He was an assistant coach with Greece at the EuroBasket 2009, and the 2010 FIBA World Championship.

Coaching record

EuroLeague

|- 
| align="left"|Olympiacos
| align="left"|2014–15
| 26 || 18 || 8 ||  || align="center"|Lost in the final game
|- 
| align="left"|Olympiacos
| align="left"|2015–16
| 24 || 14 || 10 ||  || align="center"|Eliminated in the Top 16 stage
|- 
| align="left"|Olympiacos
| align="left"|2016–17
| 37 || 23 || 14 ||  || align="center"|Lost in the final game
|- 
| align="left"|Olympiacos
| align="left"|2017–18
| 34 || 20 || 14 ||  || align="center"|Eliminated in the quarterfinals
|- 
| align="left"|Maccabi Tel Aviv
| align="left"|2018–19
| 23 || 13 || 10 || || align="center" |Eliminated in the regular season
|- 
| align="left"|Maccabi Tel Aviv
| align="left"|2019–20
| 28 || 19 || 9 || || align="center" |Cancelled due to Covid-19 pandemic
|- 
| align="left"|Maccabi Tel Aviv
| align="left"|2020–21
| 34 || 14 || 20 || || align="center" |Eliminated in the regular season
|- 
| align="left"|Maccabi Tel Aviv
| align="left"|2021–22
| 23 || 11 || 12 || || align="center" |Sacked
|- 
|-class="sortbottom"
| align="center" colspan=2|Career||229||132||97||||

Awards and accomplishments

As Assistant coach

Greece national team
EuroBasket 2009:

Pro clubs
 Greek Cup Winner: (1999)
 VTB United League Champion: (2012)
 Russian Championship Champion: (2012)

As Head coach

Pro clubs
 2× EuroLeague Runner-up: (2015, 2017)
 2× Greek League Champion: (2015, 2016)
 1× Greek League Best Coach: (2015)
 3× Israeli League Champion: (2019, 2020, 2021)
 1× Israeli Cup Winner: (2021)
 2× Israeli League Best Coach: (2019, 2020)
 2× Israeli Basketball League Cup  (2020, 2021)

Personal life
Sfairopoulos is married and has two sons.

References

External links
 Ioannis Sfairopoulos at euroleague.net
 Ioannis Sfairopoulos, Olympiacos: 'Above all, I love basketball!' at euroleague.net

1967 births
Living people
Apollon Kalamarias B.C. coaches
Apollon Kalamarias B.C. players
Greek basketball coaches
Greek expatriate basketball people in Israel
Greek men's basketball players
Kolossos Rodou B.C. coaches
Maccabi Tel Aviv B.C. coaches
Olympiacos B.C. coaches
Panionios B.C. coaches
P.A.O.K. BC coaches
Point guards
Basketball players from Thessaloniki